Browning may refer to:

Arts and entertainment
 The Browning, an American electronicore band
 Browning, a set of variations by the composer William Byrd

Places
 Browning, Georgia, USA
 Browning, Illinois, USA
 Browning, Missouri, USA
 Browning, Montana, USA
 Browning, Texas, an unincorporated community in Smith County, Texas, USA
 Browning, Wisconsin, USA

 Browning, Saskatchewan, Canada
 Rural Municipality of Browning No. 34, Saskatchewan, Canada, a rural municipality
 25851 Browning, a minor planet

People
 Browning (name)

Science and technology
 Browning machine gun (disambiguation), a family of guns
 Browning Arms Company, initially marketing the sporting designs of John Browning
 , a coaster

Food 
 Browning (partial cooking), the cooking process that removes excessive fat from meat and changes its color to a light brown
 Gravy browning, a substance used to darken and flavour gravies, soups etc.
 Food browning, chemical reactions affecting foods such as apples

Other uses
 Browning (steel), a surface finishing process to increase corrosion resistance
 Browning School, a private boys' school in New York City

See also
 
 Browns (disambiguation)
 Brown (disambiguation)
 Justice Browning (disambiguation)